Miloš Hoferka (born May 19, 1983) is a Czech male curler.

At the national level, he is a three-time Czech mixed bronze medallist (2000, 2009, 2014).

Teams

Men's

Mixed

Mixed doubles

Personal life
He started curling in 1999 at the age of 16.

References

External links

Team – Curlingový tým S5

Living people
1983 births
Sportspeople from Hradec Králové
Czech male curlers

Competitors at the 2007 Winter Universiade